Drill is an unincorporated community in Russell and Buchanan Counties, Virginia, United States.

History
A post office called Drill was established in 1908, and remained in operation until 1963. The origin of the name "Drill" is obscure.

References

Unincorporated communities in Buchanan County, Virginia
Unincorporated communities in Russell County, Virginia
Unincorporated communities in Virginia